Calobata petronella is a species of fly in the family Micropezidae. It is found in the Palearctic.

References

Micropezidae
Insects described in 1761
Diptera of Asia
Taxa named by Carl Linnaeus